William Frank Selby (born June 11, 1970) is a former utility player from  to  with the Boston Red Sox, Cincinnati Reds, and Cleveland Indians. Selby played in 198 total MLB games, with a .223 career batting average. The most dramatic of those home runs came on July 14, when he hit a walk-off grand slam against Mariano Rivera to defeat the New York Yankees, 10-7, in the bottom of the 9th inning. It was the first walk-off home run that Rivera had allowed in his career.

Bill Selby became the sixth player in (Triple-A team) Buffalo Bisons club history to be inducted into the Buffalo Baseball Hall of Fame on August 25, 2007. In the Bisons' modern era, Selby ranks first in hits (378), doubles (90), RBI (245) and runs (217). He's second in games played (370) and third in home runs (60).

"Selby is God" fans
While playing minor league baseball for the Pawtucket Red Sox in 1996, during an away game in Columbus, Ohio, Selby was introduced to three Ohio State University students (and Cleveland Indians fans) who became very vocal fans. Two days later, Selby was called up to the parent Boston club, playing in Cleveland, and he had a base hit that Friday evening against Cleveland closer José Mesa. The three fans made the trip that weekend and debuted a large cardboard sign that read, merely, "Selby is God." (The sign is an homage to a previous "Bernie is God" sign that honored Cowboy QB (and ex-Cleveland Browns legend) Bernie Kosar.)

The "Selby is God" fans received some notoriety after Selby's grand slam off Rivera in 2002, appearing in The Plain Dealer and on television.

Nicknaming Travis Hafner
Selby is also known for bestowing Cleveland Indians DH Travis Hafner with his nickname, "Pronk". Selby explained the nickname to the Buffalo News:
Texas came to town in 2002 and I was with [former Indian] Lee Stevens on the bench saying, 'This dude is unbelievable. He's a real project.' He was hitting the ball everywhere. We got him the next spring and we called him 'Project' all the time. One day I passed him, and said, 'What's up, you big donkey?' He said, 'Hey, I can't be the Project and the Donkey.'So we started going with 'Pronkey'. In Spanish, we made it 'El Pronko.' Then it got down to 'The Pronk' and finally just 'Pronk.' It fits him. He doesn't look like Shrek or anything else. He just looks like a Pronk.

References

External links

Article regarding Selby’s Buffalo Sports Hall of Fame induction, on August 25, 2007 (as published at Desoto Times-Tribune (Desoto, Mississippi), on April 26, 2017

1970 births
Living people
Águilas Cibaeñas players
American expatriate baseball players in the Dominican Republic
Akron Aeros players
American expatriate baseball players in Japan
American expatriate baseball players in Mexico
Baseball players from Alabama
Boston Red Sox players
Buffalo Bisons (minor league) players
Cleveland Indians players
Cincinnati Reds players
Elmira Pioneers players
Iowa Cubs players
Louisville RiverBats players
Lynchburg Red Sox players
Major League Baseball left fielders
Major League Baseball right fielders
Major League Baseball second basemen
Major League Baseball third basemen
Memphis Redbirds players
Nippon Professional Baseball center fielders
Nippon Professional Baseball first basemen
Nippon Professional Baseball right fielders
New Britain Red Sox players
Nippon Professional Baseball outfielders
Nippon Professional Baseball third basemen
Pawtucket Red Sox players
People from Monroeville, Alabama
Piratas de Campeche players
Southern Miss Golden Eagles baseball players
Trenton Thunder players
Yokohama BayStars players